Charles Joseph Esterly (February 8, 1888 – September 3, 1940) was a Republican member of the U.S. House of Representatives from Pennsylvania.

Biography
Charles J. Esterly was born in Reading, Pennsylvania.  He was employed with an electric company until 1916 and later in the sales department of a knitting mill.  He was also engaged in the breeding of Ayrshire cattle and Berkshire hogs.  He served as president and director of a water company, and as a director of a knitting mill and bottle-stopper company.  He was a member of the board of school directors of Wyomissing, Pennsylvania, from 1914 to 1920, and a committeeman of Wyomissing Borough from 1917 to 1921.  He was a delegate to the Republican National Convention in 1920, and a member of the Republican State committee from 1922 to 1924.

Esterly was elected as a Republican to the Sixty-ninth Congress.  He declined to be a candidate for renomination in 1926.  He was again elected to the Seventy-first Congress, but was not a candidate for renomination in 1930.  He resumed former business interests, and died in Wernersville, Pennsylvania.  Interment in Charles Evans Cemetery in Reading.

Sources

The Political Graveyard

1888 births
1940 deaths
American Lutherans
Burials at Charles Evans Cemetery
Politicians from Reading, Pennsylvania
Republican Party members of the United States House of Representatives from Pennsylvania
20th-century American politicians
20th-century Lutherans